Jane MacLaren Walsh is an anthropologist and researcher at the Smithsonian's National Museum of Natural History in Washington, D.C. She is known for her role in exposing faked pre-Columbian artifacts.

Early life and education
Walsh grew up in Mexico and studied at the University of the Americas for B.A. and M.A. degrees. She received her Ph.D. in Anthropology at Catholic University of America with the doctoral thesis "Myth and imagination in the American story : the Coronado expedition, 1540-1542."

Career
Walsh's research specialty is crystal skulls, an artifact type often purported to be of Precolumbian origin and frequently revealed as hoaxes by archaeologists. Her interest in these objects began with the anonymous delivery of one such object to the Smithsonian in 1992.

Notable cases she has investigated include crystal skulls alleged to have been of ancient Mesoamerican (mostly Aztec) origins, and a piece held by the Dumbarton Oaks Research Library and Collection purported to be an authentic pre-Columbian representation of Tlazolteotl, an Aztec and central Mexican goddess.

Selected works

References

American anthropologists
American biographers
American Mesoamericanists
Catholic University of America alumni
Historians of Mesoamerican art
Smithsonian Institution people
Women Mesoamericanists
Living people
Crystal skull
Year of birth missing (living people)
American women scientists
21st-century Mesoamericanists
21st-century American non-fiction writers
21st-century American women writers